Nowy Kamień may refer to the following places in Poland:
Nowy Kamień, Świętokrzyskie Voivodeship (south-central Poland)
Nowy Kamień, Masovian Voivodeship (east-central Poland)